is a passenger railway station located in the city of Hachiōji, Tokyo, Japan, operated by the private railway operator Keio Corporation.
It is a five-minute walk from JR East's Hachiōji Station.

Lines 
Keiō-hachiōji Station is a terminus of the Keio Line, and is located 37.9 kilometers from the opposing terminus of the line at Shinjuku Station.

Station layout 

This station consists of one underground dead-headed island platforms serving two tracks,  with the station building located above.

Platforms

History
The station opened on 24 March 1925, originally named . The station was renamed on 11 December 1963 and moved 190 m closer to Tokyo. The station was rebuilt as an underground station on 2 April 1989.

From 22 February 2013, station numbering was introduced on Keio lines, with Keiō-hachiōji Station becoming "KO34".

Passenger statistics
In fiscal 2019, the station was used by an average of 58,124  passengers daily. 

The passenger figures (boarding passengers only) for previous years are as shown below.

Surrounding area
 Hachiōji Station (JR East Chuo Main Line)

References

External links

 Keiō-hachiōji Station station information 

Keio Line
Stations of Keio Corporation
Railway stations in Tokyo
Railway stations in Japan opened in 1925
Hachiōji, Tokyo